The 2014–15 Albany Great Danes women's basketball team represents the University at Albany, SUNY during the 2014–15 NCAA Division I women's basketball season. The Great Danes were led by fifth year head coach Katie Abrahamson-Henderson and play their home games at SEFCU Arena. They were members of the America East Conference. The Great Danes enter the season as 3-time consecutive champs in the America East after winning the 2014 America East tournament. They finished the season 24–9, 14–2 in America East play to share the America East regular season title with Maine. They were also champions of the America East Women's Tournament for the fourth straight year and they received an automatic bid of the NCAA women's tournament where they lost in the first round to Duke.

Media
All home games and conference road games will stream on either ESPN3 on AmericaEast.tv. Most road games will stream on the opponents website. Selected games will be broadcast on the radio on WCDB.

Roster

Schedule

|-
!colspan=12 style="background:#452663; color:#FFC726;"| Regular season

|-
!colspan=12 style="background:#FFC726; color:#452663;"| 2015 America East tournament

|-
!colspan=12 style="background:#FFC726; color:#452663;"| 2015 NCAA Women's Tournament

Rankings
2014–15 NCAA Division I women's basketball rankings

See also
2014–15 Albany Great Danes men's basketball team
Albany Great Danes women's basketball

References

Albany
Albany Great Danes women's basketball seasons
Albany
Albany Great Danes
Albany Great Danes